Twilight Online (恐怖在線) is a 2014 Hong Kong horror film directed by Maggie To.

Box office
The film has grossed HK$3.84 million at the Hong Kong box office.

References

External links

2014 films
2014 horror films
Hong Kong horror films
Hong Kong supernatural horror films
2010s Hong Kong films